Lists of the most common surnames by continent:

 List of most common surnames in Africa
 List of most common surnames in Asia
 List of most common surnames in Europe
 List of most common surnames in North America
 List of most common surnames in Oceania
 List of most common surnames in South America

See also 
 List of family name affixes
 List of most popular given names
 List (surname)

 
Surnames